Bruno Freschi (born 1937) is a Canadian architect and an officer in the Order of Canada, known for his role as chief architect for Expo 86 in Vancouver, British Columbia, Canada. Some of his notable works include Science World in Vancouver, the Ismaili Centre in Burnaby, and the Staples Residence in Vancouver.

Biography 
Freschi was born in Trail, British Columbia, on April 18, 1937. He studied architecture at the University of British Columbia where he received Canada's top architecture student award . He then studied in London at the Architectural Association before returning to Vancouver, British Columbia, Canada to work with Arthur Erickson in the 1960s. He founded his own firm, Bruno Freschi Architects, in 1970 in Vancouver. He was dean of the school of architecture and planning at the State University of New York at Buffalo, NY, USA until 2002.

Works
1966 - Designs the Staples Residence in West Vancouver, an icon of west coast modern architecture. 
1985 - Completes the architecture, design, and construction of the Vancouver Ismaili Centre for His Highness the Aga Khan.
1986 - Master Planner & Chief Architect, Expo 86.
Freschi's work explores mediums as a form of expressionism. He also explores themes for politics and urbanization through painting and sculpture. His exhibition, 'Body Politick: The Art & Architecture of Bruno Freschi' opened on June 28, 2018, at Il Museo inside the Italian Cultural Centre in Vancouver.

Awards
In 1985, Bruno Freschi was awarded the Officer, Order of Canada for Architecture (O.C.).

References

Canadian architects
University of British Columbia alumni
State University of New York faculty
1937 births
Living people
People from Trail, British Columbia
Expo 86
Officers of the Order of Canada